Julie Blakstad (born 27 August 2001) is a Norwegian professional footballer who plays as a midfielder for Women's Super League club Manchester City and the Norway national team.

Club career 
She is originally from Ottestad in Stange and started her senior career in Ottestad IL in the 3rd division.

FL Fart 
In the summer of 2018, she went to FL Fart in the 1st division and was very involved in the club moving up to the Toppserien that autumn. She continued to impress greatly at the top level. After turning down offers from around half of the clubs in the Toppserien, as well as requests from foreign clubs, it was announced in September 2019 that she was ready for LSK Kvinner on loan. The Football Association received a complaint about the loan agreement from another club, and after looking at the transfer once more, it was cancelled. Blakstad thus completed the season in Fart and was voted Young Player of the Year in the Toppserien.

Before the 2020 season, there was great excitement about what would be the next step in Blakstad's career. LSK Kvinner still wanted to secure the great talent, and she trained with the English big club Chelsea.

Rosenborg 
In June 2020, the news came that she had signed for Rosenborg. She made her mark immediately and made history with a goal in the series premiere against LSK Kvinner, the first goal after Trondheims-Ørn became Rosenborg. It was a great season for both Blakstad and Rosenborg, who went undefeated through the season and took silver in the series. 19-year-old Blakstad was nominated for Player of the Year in Toppserien 2020. The nomination committee stated, "The super talent has impressed for several seasons... She is fearless, explosive, and has offensive qualities at international level. Going forward on the field, she is Rosenborg's most important player and has been involved in over a third of Trønder's goals this season."

In January 2021, she was picked on UEFA's list of ten footballers to watch out for in 2021. At the same time as she continued her big game in 2021, more and more noticed the great talent. Football commentator Kasper Wikestad stated that she is perhaps the greatest talent he has seen live. During the season, she emerged as one of the Toppserien's absolute best players at the same time as she had established herself on the senior Norway national team. She was once again nominated as Player of the Year and won the Young Player of the Year award in Toppserien 2021.

Manchester City 
In January 2022, Blakstad signed for the English major club Manchester City in what was referred to as the biggest transfer from Norwegian football ever. Just days later, she made her debut in the 3-0 win over Tottenham in the semi-finals of the League Cup.

National team career 
Blakstad has international matches for U15, U16, U17, U19, and the Norwegian national team. 

In 2019 she was part of the under-19 squad that played the 2019 U19 European Championship.  She played the three matches in her group but was eliminated when they were third place.  In March 2020 she was also part of the under-19 team that participated in the La Manga tournament.

In September 2020, she was selected for the senior national team for the first time.  The debut came on 27 October 2020 away to Wales, in the match where Norway secured a ticket to the European Championship in England 2022. On September 16, 2021, Blakstad scored her first international goal in the 10-0 win against Armenia as part of the 2023 World Cup qualification. In the 2022 Euro, she scored her team's first goal in the championship, in the opening match against Northern Ireland.  In the first game after the European Championship, the deciding game to win the group in qualifying for the 2023 World Cup against Belgium, which was won 1-0, whereby the Norwegians qualified for the World Cup, Blakstad was in the starting lineup.

Career statistics

Club

International

Scores and results list Norway's goal tally first, score column indicates score after each Blakstad goal.

Honours 
Manchester City
 FA Women's League Cup: 2021–22
Individual
 Toppserien 2019: Breakthrough of the year
 Toppserien 2020: Nominated for Player of the Year
 Toppserien 2021: Young Player of the Year, nominated for Player of the Year
 UEFA 2021: 10 footballers to watch out for in 2021

References

2001 births
Living people
People from Stange
Norwegian women's footballers
Norway women's youth international footballers
Norway women's international footballers
FL Fart players
Rosenborg BK Kvinner players
Toppserien players
Women's association football midfielders
Sportspeople from Innlandet
UEFA Women's Euro 2022 players
Expatriate sportspeople in England